David Caldwell (born c. 1974) is an American football executive who is a personnel executive for the  Philadelphia Eagles of the National Football League (NFL). He previously served as the general manager of the Jacksonville Jaguars from 2013 to 2020. Prior to that, he worked for the Carolina Panthers, Indianapolis Colts, and Atlanta Falcons.

Early life
Caldwell was born in Buffalo, New York where he attended Saint Francis Highschool, where he was teammates with Brian Daboll, Tom Telesco and Brian Polian.  He went on to attend John Carroll University where he played linebacker from 1992 to 1996.  He was a teammate of  Baltimore Ravens offensive coordinator Greg Roman, Brian Polian., Josh McDaniels, London Fletcher, formerly a linebacker with the St. Louis Rams, Buffalo Bills, and Washington Redskins, as well as Tom Telesco.

Executive career

Carolina Panthers
Caldwell began his career as a scouting assistant for the Carolina Panthers from 1996 to 1997.

Indianapolis Colts
Caldwell spent ten years (1998–2007) with the Indianapolis Colts as an area scout. He was a member of the staff when the team won Super Bowl XLI in 2006.

Atlanta Falcons
In 2008, Caldwell was hired by the Atlanta Falcons as their director of college scouting. In 2012, he was promoted to director of player personnel.

Jacksonville Jaguars
On January 8, 2013, Caldwell was named the general manager of the Jacksonville Jaguars. His first order of business with the team was to fire the head coach Mike Mularkey who had just completed his first season. On January 17, 2013, the team hired former Seattle Seahawks defensive coordinator Gus Bradley as his replacement, who was eventually fired late in the 2016 season.  On February 23, 2018, the Jaguars extended his contract through 2021.

On November 29, 2020, Caldwell was fired by the Jaguars following a 27–25 loss to the Cleveland Browns and a 1–10 start to the season. He finished his tenure in Jacksonville with a  record and a  playoff record for a  career record.

Philadelphia Eagles
In 2021, Caldwell was hired by the Philadelphia Eagles as a personnel executive. On June 3, 2022, it was announced that Caldwell had assumed the roles of senior personnel director and advisor to the general manager.

References

External links
 Philadelphia Eagles bio
 Jacksonville Jaguars bio

1974 births
Living people
Atlanta Falcons executives
Carolina Panthers scouts
Indianapolis Colts scouts
Jacksonville Jaguars executives
Philadelphia Eagles executives
National Football League general managers
Sportspeople from Buffalo, New York
American football people from New York (state)
American football linebackers
John Carroll Blue Streaks football players